Michael Akhaine Osebhajimete Omoighe (11 July 1958 – 23 January 2021), better known as Mike Omoighe, was a Nigerian painter, curator, art critic and teacher of art. Born in Opoji Ekpoma area of Edo State in Nigeria, he grew up and lived in Lagos, Nigeria most of his life.

Omoighe studied at Yaba College of Technology (1978, ND); at Auchi Polytechnic, Auchi (1980, HND); at the University of Lagos - UNILAG (1987, Certificate in Polytechnic Management (CPM) NBTE)) and at the University of Ibadan (1994, Master's degree in Visual Arts Communication)  M.C.A.) He was a pupil of the painter and graphic artist, Bruce Onobrakpeya.

From 1986 till his demise, Omoighe taught painting and drawing at the Yaba College of Technology, where he had been the Head of the Department of Fine Art, Dean of School of Art, Design and Printing and Dean of Student Affairs at Yaba College of Technology, Lagos Nigeria. He was also the Nigerian President of the International Association of Art Critics, AICA.

Omoighe was married to the painter Titi Omoighe, with children. He died from COVID-19 complications on January 23, 2021, at the age of 62.

Solo exhibitions 

1980: Auchi, Bendel State
1982: National Arts Theatre, Iganmu, Lagos
1983: Goethe-Institut, Lagos
1984: Italian Cultural Centre, Lagos
1984: Scruples, 28 Bode Thomas, Surulere, Lagos
1988: Italian Cultural Centre, Lagos
1990: Alliance Francaise, Kano; Journey Through Savannah, Didi Museum, Lagos
1993: Emotion, National Museum, Onikan, Lagos
1996: Beijing Series - Chevron Lekki Lagos
1996/1997: Jacinta's Place, Probyn Street Ikoyi Lagos (Salon)
2000: Survival Romance, National Gallery of Art, Iganmu, Lagos
2005: Seasons and Chain of Coincidences, National Museum, Lagos

References

External links 
 Mike Omoighe at Yaba College

1958 births
2021 deaths
Nigerian painters
Nigerian art curators
University of Lagos alumni
University of Ibadan alumni
Artists from Lagos
Auchi Polytechnic alumni
People from Edo State
Deaths from the COVID-19 pandemic in Nigeria